National trauma is a concept in psychology and social psychology. A national trauma is one in which the effects of a trauma apply generally to the members of a collective group such as a country or other well-defined group of people. Trauma is an injury that has the potential to severely negatively affect an individual, whether physically or psychologically.  Psychological trauma is a shattering of the fundamental assumptions that a person has about themselves and the world.  An adverse experience that is unexpected, painful, extraordinary, and shocking results in interruptions in ongoing processes or relationships and may also create maladaptive responses.  Such experiences can affect not only an individual but can also be collectively experienced by an entire group of people. Tragic experiences can collectively wound or threaten the national identity, that sense of belonging shared by a nation as a whole represented by tradition culture, language, and politics.

In individual psychological trauma, fundamental assumptions about how the individual relates to the world, such as that the world is benevolent and meaningful and that the individual has worth in the world, are overturned by overwhelming life experiences.  Similarly, national trauma overturns fundamental assumptions of social identity – something terrible has happened and social life has lost its predictability. The causes of such shatterings of assumptions are diverse and defy neat categorization.  For example, wars are not always national traumas; while the Vietnam War is experienced by Americans as a national trauma Winston Churchill famously titled the closing volume of his history of the Second World War Triumph and Tragedy.  Similar types of natural disasters can also provoke different responses. The 2016 Fort McMurray Wildfire in Alberta was a collective trauma for not only that local community but also the large Canadian Province of Alberta despite causing no direct deaths yet the much larger Peshtigo Fire responsible for thousands of deaths is largely forgotten.

Responses to national trauma also vary.  A nation that experiences clear defeat in war which had mobilized the nation to a high degree will almost inevitably also experience national trauma but the way in which that defeat is felt can change the response. The former peoples of the Confederate South in the American Civil War and the German Empire in World War I both created post-war mythologies (the Lost Cause in the former and the Stab-in-the-back Myth in the latter) of "glorious" defeat in unfair fights.  The post-war experience of Germany after World War Two, however, is much more complex and provoked reactions from a sense of German national guilt to collective ignorance. A common national response to these traumas is repeated calls for national unity and moral purification, as in the post-9/11 United States or post-war Japan.

Examples

 1979 energy crisis in the United States
 1985 Mexico City earthquake
 2004 Indian Ocean earthquake and tsunami in Indonesia Sri Lanka, and Thailand
 2011 Tōhoku earthquake and tsunami in Japan 
 2020 Beirut explosion in Lebanon
 American Civil War in the American South
 Armenian genocide in Armenia and the Armenian diaspora
 Apartheid in South Africa
 Assassinations of John F. Kennedy, Robert F. Kennedy, and Martin Luther King Jr. in the United States
 Assassination of Olof Palme in Sweden
 Assassination of Yitzhak Rabin in Israel
 Attack on Pearl Harbor in the United States
 Battle of Adwa in Italy
 Battle of Alcácer Quibir in Portugal
 Battle of Annual in Spain
 Battle of the Boyne in Ireland
 Battle of Caporetto in Italy
 Battle of Kosovo in Serbia
 Harrying of the North, scorched earth campaign in North England & Yorkshire during the foundation of the British Monarchy.
 Battle of Mohács in Hungary
 Berlin Wall in Germany
 Bosnian War in Bosnia and Herzegovina
 Cambodian genocide under Pol Pot and the Khmer Rouge in Cambodia
 Chernobyl disaster in Ukraine and Belarus 
 Century of humiliation in China
 Cuban Missile Crisis in the United States
 Dirty War in Argentina 
 Falklands War in Argentina
 Finnish Civil War, Winter War, Continuation War, and Lapland War in Finland
 Franco-Prussian War in France
 German occupation of Denmark during the Second World War
 Greco-Turkish War, the Greek Genocide and the subsequent Population exchange between Greece and Turkey  in Greece 
 Great Depression in the United States
 Great Famine in Ireland
 Great Kanto earthquake in Japan
 The Holocaust for European Jewish peoples
 Iran hostage crisis in the United States
 McCarthyism in the United States
 MH370 and MH17 incidents in Malaysia
 Nepalese royal massacre in Nepal
 Norman conquest in England
 North Sea flood of 1953 in the Netherlands 
 Pinochet dictatorship in Chile
 Rwandan genocide in Rwanda
 Second Boer War in South Africa
 Second Schleswig War (1864) in Denmark
 September 11 attacks in the United States
 Srebrenica massacre in Bosnia and Herzegovina and the Netherlands
 Spanish–American War in Spain
 Spanish Civil War and Francoism in Spain
 Treaty of Trianon in Hungary (see Trianon Syndrome)
 Vietnam War in the United States
 War of the Pacific in Peru
 Watergate scandal in the United States
 World War I in Germany
 World War II in Germany and Japan
 COVID-19 pandemic

See also 

 Collective memory

References

Crowd psychology
Psychological concepts
Grief